The Volkswagen Transporter, based on the Volkswagen Group's T platform, now in its seventh generation, refers to a series of vans produced for over 70 years and marketed worldwide.

The T series is now considered an official Volkswagen Group automotive platform. and generations are sequentially named T1, T2, T3, T4, T5, T6 and T7. Pre-dating the T platform designations, the first three generations were named Type 2, indicating their relative position to the Type 1, or Beetle.  As part of the T platform, the first three generations are retroactively named T1, T2 and T3.

The Transporter is the best-selling van in history with over 12 million units sold worldwide, and it comprises a gamut of variants including vans, minivans, minibuses, pick-ups and campervans. Competitors include the Ford Transit, Toyota HiAce and Mercedes-Benz Vito.



Type 2

T1 (1949) 

Initially derived from the Volkswagen Type 1 (Volkswagen Beetle), the Volkswagen Type 2 (T1) was the first generation of Volkswagen's Transporter family.

T2 (1967) 

The Volkswagen T2 platform was marketed from 1967 through 1979 model years, with a Volkswagen Type 4 engine optionally available from 1972 on.

T3 (1979) 

The Volkswagen (Type 2) T3 Transporter, also known as T25 in the UK or VW Vanagon in the United States, was introduced in 1979. The T3 Transporter was one of the last all-new bodied Volkswagen platforms that still used an air-cooled, rear-engine design.

Compared to its predecessor, (the T2), the T3 was sturdier and heavier, with a slightly larger, much more square and boxy body, that offered more usable interior space than the original models' rounded front side, roof, and edges. The T3, with its front now folding sharply along a horizontal middle axis, instead of the old model's curve, is sometimes called "the wedge" by enthusiasts, to differentiate it from earlier VW "Kombis".

The Volkswagen air-cooled boxer engine was supplanted by a water-cooled one – though still rear-mounted – in 1983.

A four-wheel drive Syncro model was introduced, premiering in January 1985.

While production of the T3 ended in Europe with the Syncro produced in Austria until 1992, the T3 was also produced in South Africa, until 2002.

Transporter/Multivan

T4 (1990) 

The first officially designated "T platform" vehicle, the Volkswagen Transporter (T4) dramatically updated the Volkswagen van line by using a front-mounted, front-wheel drive, water-cooled engine. The T4 was marketed in North America as the Volkswagen Eurovan.

T5 (2003)

2003–2009 (pre-facelift) 

The Volkswagen Transporter (T5) is a variant of the Volkswagen T platform. In North America it is sold in Mexico but neither in the United States nor Canada. As with other light trucks, the T5 range would face a 25% tariff, known as the chicken tax, if imported to the US.

2009–2015 (facelift) 

The Transporter T5 range received a facelift in late 2009.  Updated powertrain options include common rail diesel engines, and a world-first usage in a light commercial vehicle of a dual clutch transmission – namely Volkswagen Group's 7-speed Direct-Shift Gearbox (DSG).

T6 (2016) 

In 2016, Volkswagen released the T6 Transporter which is based on the T5 Transporter. A refreshed version was first shown in 2019 as the T6.1 Transporter.

T7 (2022) 

In June 2021, Volkswagen unveiled a new passenger van as the "T7 Multivan" to replace the Caravelle. The T7 Multivan went on sale in Europe in 2022.

The T7 moved from the T6's dedicated van platform to the car-based MQB platform. This gives it longer overhangs front and rear, but allows for a plug-in hybrid option for the first time.

For commercial markets (cargo/panel van), the T6.1 Transporter will continue in production until 2023. The commercial van successor to the T6.1 Transporter will be built as a sibling of the Ford Transit Custom at Ford Otosan in Turkey. Both the VW and Ford vans will be offered with diesel, mild hybrid, plug-in hybrid, or all-electric drivetrains. Sales of this commercial model is expected to begin in 2024.

See also 
 Abt Sportsline
 Chassis cab

References

External links

Vans
Minibuses
Minivans
Front-wheel-drive vehicles
All-wheel-drive vehicles
Cars introduced in 1950
Cars powered by VR engines
1950s cars
1960s cars
1970s cars
1980s cars
1990s cars
2000s cars
Transporter
Pickup trucks